The Wood–Hughes House is a historical house located at 614 S. Austin in Brenham, Texas. Built in 1897, the house is an example of Late Victorian architecture. Owners W. A. and Fannie Wood built the house using high-quality lumber and siding that resembled stone. The house was purchased by planter and rancher Henry W. Hughes in 1913. The house resembles the F. W. Schuerenberg House, which is also in Brenham.

The house was added to the National Register of Historic Places on March 29, 1990.

See also

National Register of Historic Places listings in Washington County, Texas
Recorded Texas Historic Landmarks in Washington County

References

Houses on the National Register of Historic Places in Texas
Queen Anne architecture in Texas
Houses completed in 1897
Houses in Washington County, Texas
National Register of Historic Places in Washington County, Texas
Brenham, Texas